Distington is a civil parish in the Borough of Copeland, Cumbria, England.  It contains six listed buildings that are recorded in the National Heritage List for England.  All the listed buildings are designated at Grade II, the lowest of the three grades, which is applied to "buildings of national importance and special interest".  The parish contains the village of Distington and the surrounding countryside.  The listed buildings comprise the ruins of a former church, the ruins of a former tower house, a closed Methodist church, an active church, a farmhouse and associated buildings, and a milestone.


Buildings

References

Citations

Sources

Lists of listed buildings in Cumbria